Long Way Up is a British television series which debuted 18 September 2020, documenting a motorcycle journey undertaken in 2019 by Ewan McGregor and Charley Boorman, from Ushuaia in Argentina through South and Central America to Los Angeles in the United States. It is a follow-up to 2004's Long Way Round where the pair rode from London to New York and then again in 2007 Long Way Down, when they rode south from John o' Groats in Scotland through eighteen countries in Europe and Africa to Cape Town in South Africa.

The first three episodes of Long Way Up premiered globally on Apple TV+ on Friday, 18 September 2020, and eight further episodes aired weekly through to 13 November 2020.

Overview
The journey covered 13,000 miles, through 13 countries over 100 days starting on 5 September 2019 and finishing on 14 December 2019. They rode Harley-Davidson LiveWire electric motorcycles manufactured by Harley-Davidson that had been converted into adventure bikes. Accompanying Ewan and Charley are the same key team members from Long Way Round and Long Way Down, including director/producers David Alexanian and Russ Malkin and directors of photography Jimmy Simak and Claudio Von Planta. Also joining is associate producer Taylor Estevez and cinematographer Anthony Von Seck. The production team followed Ewan and Charley’s route in prototype Rivian electric trucks built especially for the journey. Cars and motorcycles were charged at charging points built especially for the journey by Rivian.  They were supported by diesel powered vehicles and generators and back up bikes.

Route
The series follows Ewan and Charley as they journey through Latin America including the countries of Argentina, Chile, Bolivia, Peru, Ecuador, and up through Colombia, Central America — Panama, Costa Rica, Nicaragua, Honduras, Guatemala — and Mexico, before entering the United States and finishing in California.

Episode 2 route
 Ushuaia official start at carpark Bahia Lapataia
 Tolhuin, first charge at public charging point "JuiceBox"
 Rio Grande
 Border Crossing Argentina/Chile
 Parque Pingüino Rey Pinguin station 
 Onaisin

Episode 3 route
 Onaisin, had to charge from diesel generator, brought in by truck, due to the power at the hotel being insufficient to charge both bikes adequately.
 Porvenir, Ewan's bike went out of charge before the ferry and had to be towed by one of the cars by Ewan holding on to the car.
 Punta Arenas

Episode 4 route
 Villa Mañihuales
 Chaiten
 Puerto Montt
 Aluminé

Episode 5 route
 Calchaquí Valley
 San Antonio de Los Cobres
 San Pedro de Atacama
 Laguna Colorada, Bolivia

Episode 6 route
 Siloli Desert
 Uyuni Salt Flats
 La Paz
 Lake Titicaca

Episode 7 route
 Chucuito
 Machu Picchu
 Ayacucho
 Nazca Lines

Episode 8 route
 Guayaquil
 Montecristi
 Jama-Coaque Reserve
 Tulcan
 Las Lajas Shrine

Episode 9 route
 Pasto
 Buenaventura
 Medellin
 Panama Canal
 San José, Costa Rica
 Chiquiri

Episode 10 route
 Guanacaste
 Playa Hermosa
 Masaya Volcano
 San Pedro Sula, Honduras
 Ipala Volcano, Guatemala
 Tehuantepec

Episode 11 route
 Oaxaca
 Teotihuacan
 Juarez
 Los Angeles

Episodes

Music
The title song was performed by Welsh group Stereophonics, and is similar to the Long Way Round and Long Way Down theme with the lyrics "round" and "down" replaced with "up". Other artists to feature include: Jhony Rojas (two songs under Astronauta, two with Passto and four with Últimos Glaciares), Totó la Momposina, Aurelio, Sidestepper, Los de Abajo and Charlie Winston. During Episode 6 in Bolivia, McGregor performs an acoustic guitar cover of Endlessly by Muse, from their album Absolution.

Critical reception 
On the review aggregator website Rotten Tomatoes, the series holds an approval rating of 100% based on 6 reviews, with an average user rating of 8.50/10.

UNICEF
During Long Way Round, Ewan and Charley visited three UNICEF programmes in Ukraine, Kazakhstan, and Mongolia and then after they were made UK ambassadors, the pair embarked on their second adventure Long Way Down and saw UNICEF’s work with child soldiers in Uganda and land-mine awareness programmes in Ethiopia. The Long Way Up series sees the duo visit three more UNICEF programmes in Bolivia, Peru and Honduras. In Bolivia, Ewan and Charley visit the UNICEF supported Quechua indigenous Challamayu School and attend a bilingual lesson taught in Spanish and traditional Quechuan. The UNICEF program is designed to give indigenous Bolivian children the opportunity to learn and further their education in their own language.

See also
List of long-distance motorcycle riders

References

External links
 – official site
Long Way Up – promo site

Long Way Up on Rotten Tomatoes

2020 British television series debuts
2020 British television series endings
2020s British documentary television series
2020s British travel television series
Apple TV+ original programming
British travel television series
Long-distance motorcycle riding
Motorcycle television series
Motorcycle writing